Placodontiformes is an extinct clade of sauropterygian marine reptiles that includes placodonts and the non-placodont Palatodonta. It was erected in 2013 with the description of Palatodonta. Placodontiformes is the most basal clade of Sauropterygia and the sister group of Eosauropterygia, which includes all other sauropterygians.

Phylogeny
Below is a cladogram from Neenan et al. (2013) showing the position of Placodontiformes within Sauropterygia:

References

Placodonts